Parkfairfax is a neighborhood in Alexandria, Virginia, United States, located in the northwestern part of the city near the boundary with Arlington County. Nearby thoroughfares are Interstate 395 (Shirley Highway), State Route 402 (Quaker Lane), and West Glebe Road.

The neighborhood consists of 1,684 townhouse-type condominium apartments in more than 200 buildings on  built in 1941 and 1942 by Metropolitan Life Insurance Company of New York at the request of U.S. President Franklin Roosevelt to provide housing near the new Pentagon.  Like the neighboring Arlington County neighborhood of Fairlington, Parkfairfax is listed on both the National Register of Historic Places and on the Virginia Landmarks Register.

The name is similar to those of other Metropolitan Life projects that use a local area name preceded by "park" (e.g., Parkchester, Parklabrea, and Parkmerced) despite the area not having been a part of Fairfax County since 1801.

History

Former presidents Richard Nixon and Gerald Ford both lived in Parkfairfax for a time when they were in the United States Congress.  Secretary of State (under John F. Kennedy) Dean Rusk also lived in Parkfairfax.

In 1976, Cardinal Karol Józef Wojtyła - the future Pope John Paul II - visited the Parkfairfax apartment of Polish-American journalist John Szostak and offered his blessing.

From 1977 to 1979, Parkfairfax was renovated and sold as condominium apartments by The IDI Group Companies.

Recreation and commerce

The Arlington County community of Shirlington provides restaurants, stores, bars, live theater, a cinema, and the Washington & Old Dominion Railroad Trail trailhead within walking distance for Parkfairfax residents via a pedestrian walkway that crosses the Shirlington Circle interchange with I-395.  Nearby shopping can be found at The Village at Shirlington.

See also

 Cooperative Village
 Co-op City
 Mitchell Lama
 Parkchester, Bronx
 Parkmerced, San Francisco
 Park La Brea, Los Angeles
 Penn South
 Riverton Houses
 Rochdale Village, Queens
 Stuyvesant Town–Peter Cooper Village
 Checkers speech

References

"Complex Analysis: Not-So-Secret Garden-Style Units of Fairlington, Parkfairfax Grow in Popularity and Price" from the Washington Post

External links
Parkfairfax Homeowners' Association website
A history of Parkfairfax

Geography of Alexandria, Virginia
Washington metropolitan area
National Register of Historic Places in Alexandria, Virginia
Colonial Revival architecture in Virginia
Historic districts on the National Register of Historic Places in Virginia